The 1984 Philadelphia Eagles season was their 52nd in the National Football League (NFL). The team improved upon their previous output of 5–11, winning six games. Despite the improvement, the team failed to qualify for the playoffs for the third straight season.

Whatever outside chance the Birds had to make the playoffs was sunk on November 25 at St. Louis, when starting quarterback Ron Jaworski suffered a broken leg and missed the remainder of the season. It was the most serious injury the "Polish Rifle" ever suffered in his long career. Joe Pisarcik took over under center for the final three-plus games.

Offseason

NFL draft
The 1984 NFL Draft was held May 1–2, 1984. It was 12 rounds held over two days and televised by ESPN in great detail. A month later a draft was held for college seniors who already signed with either the CFL or USFL prior to the May 1984 draft. While the Eagles finished the 1983 NFL season with a record of 5–11 and in fourth place in the NFC East Division they would always get the 4th pick in the 12 rounds of the draft. Only the Tampa Bay Buccaneers, Houston Oilers at 2–12 and the New York Giants at 3–13 would have a worse record. It would be one of the most power balanced years.

NFL supplemental draft

This draft was held on June 5, 1984. These were players that were not drafted by an NFL team. In an attempt to head off a bidding war in its own ranks for USFL and CFL players. NFL teams chose 84 players from 224 available during the three-round selection meeting. Many of the big name USFL players were ineligible for the draft because their rights were already owned by NFL clubs.
Still 3 of the first 4 players selected would become NFL Hall Of Famers.  These players signed with the USFL before the NFL could draft them. Some teams took a chance and drafted players still so they had their NFL rights, The Dallas Cowboys of the National Football League, suspecting that the USFL was not going to last, acquired Walker's NFL rights by drafting him in the fifth round of the 1985 NFL Draft.

Personnel

Staff

Roster

Schedule

Note: Intra-division opponents are in bold text.

Standings

Game summaries

Week 4 (Sunday, September 23, 1984): vs. San Francisco 49ers 

Point spread: 49ers by 4½ 
 Over/Under: 44.0 (under)
 Time of Game:

Awards and honors
 Mike Quick, 1984 Pro Bowl selection
 Paul McFadden, All-Rookie Team, Second team All-NFC, UPI Rookie of the Year

References

External links
 1984 Philadelphia Eagles at Pro-Football-Reference.com

Philadelphia Eagles seasons
Philadelphia Eagles
Philadelphia Eagles